All in the Best Possible Taste with Grayson Perry is a 2012 documentary television series on United Kingdom station Channel 4, starring artist Grayson Perry. The series analysed the ideas of taste held by the different social classes of the United Kingdom. In it, Perry produced a series of six tapestries depicting the taste ideas of Britons, entitled "The Vanity of Small Differences."

Episodes

Reception
All In The Best Possible Taste with Grayson Perry received very positive reviews from the British press. The Daily Telegraph called it "one of the TV highlights of the year so far." The Independent described it as "lovely." The Guardian described it as a "glorious, inspired and incisive investigation into modern British taste.". On 12 May All in the Best Possible Taste with Grayson Perry won a Bafta Specialist Factual in 2013.

References

External links
Channel 4 page 

2012 British television series debuts
2012 British television series endings
Channel 4 documentaries